Martin Andersson may refer to:

Martin Andersson (cricketer) (born 1996), English cricketer
Martin Andersson (footballer, born 1982), Swedish midfielder
Martin Andersson (footballer, born 1981), Swedish defender for IF Elfsborg
Martin Andersson (sailor) (born 1969), Swedish Olympic sailor
Martin Andersson (actor) in Lotta på Bråkmakargatan

See also
Martin Anderson (disambiguation)
Martin Andersen (disambiguation)